Margëlliç can refer to two place names:
The Albanian name for Margariti, Thesprotia, Greece
Margëlliç, Fier, a village in Fier County, Albania